Vodička (feminine Vodičková) is a Czech and Slovak surname, which is a diminutive of the Czech word voda ("water"), and thus a topographic name for a person who lived by water. The name may refer to:

Antonín Vodička (1907–1975), Czech football player
Jan Vodička (1932–2014), Czech ice hockey player
Jiří Vodička (born 1988), Czech violinist
Joe Vodicka (1921–1995), American football player
Kamila Vodičková (born 1972), Czech basketball player
Ladislav Vodička (1931–1999), Czech musician
Leo Marian Vodička (born 1950), Czech singer
Radka Vodičková (born 1984), Czech athlete
Ruth Vodicka (1921–1999), American sculptor

References

Czech-language surnames
Slovak-language surnames
Toponymic surnames